Ot Danum may be,

Ot Danum people
Ot Danum language

Language and nationality disambiguation pages